Lauren Taylor (born 11 May 1970) is an English broadcast journalist, currently working for Al Jazeera English.

Education
Taylor was educated at the Lycée international de Saint-Germain-en-Laye. She graduated with an MA from the University of Oxford. She then obtained a Diploma in Journalism from the City University in London. 
As well as her native English, Taylor is fluent in German and Italian and also speaks French[fluently?] and Arabic.

Career
ITV News
Taylor joined ITV News in 1992 as a graduate trainee. She covered events such as the death of Princess Diana, the IRA bombing in Manchester, and ETA violence in Spain. In 2004, she became a political correspondent and reported on the 2004 US Presidential Election. The following year, she broadened her experience by becoming an economics correspondent, reporting on a range of business stories.

Al Jazeera English
Taylor has worked for Al Jazeera English since its launch in 2006. Initially, she was based at the main broadcast-centre, in Doha in Qatar, as a senior news anchor.

She now works primarily as a London anchor on the flagship programme Newshour, presenting news of events across Europe and also conducting live interviews for updates and breaking news. She returns occasionally to Doha as a relief-anchor. Taylor was also seen on Al Jazeera America during that channel′s simulcast of Newshour.

When based in Doha, Taylor also did stints as a field-correspondent, reporting on terrorism in Yemen, Lebanon, Egypt and Morocco. She also worked in Iraq, as an embedded-journalist with a US army unit searching for Improvised Explosive Devices (IED) in Baghdad.

References 

British television journalists
Living people
ITN newsreaders and journalists
Al Jazeera people
1970 births